Lego is a line of toys produced by the Lego Group consisting of interlocking plastic blocks.

Places
 Lego, Somalia, a village in Somalia
 Lego, West Virginia, United States
Lego House, Billund, known as “Home of the Brick”
Legoland

Art, entertainment, and media

Films
 The Lego Movie, a 2014 movie about Lego
 The Lego Movie 2: The Second Part, a 2019 sequel to the Lego Movie
 The Lego Batman Movie, 2017
The Lego Ninjago Movie, 2017

Music
 Lego (album), a 2000 album by Italian death metal band Sadist
 "Lego House", a 2011 song by Ed Sheeran
 "Lego", a single by Lady Leshurr
 "Lego", a 2005 song by The Maccabees

Television series 

 Lego City Adventures
Lego Ninjago (TV series)
Lego Masters
 List of Lego films and TV series

Video games
 List of Lego video games

Websites 

 Lego Ideas

Software
 LEGO (proof assistant)
Lego Digital Designer
Lego Life, a social media app created by Lego
 LegOS or BrickOS, an alternate firmware for the Lego Mindstorms equipment

Toys 

 List of Lego themes
Lego clone
Lego gun
Lego pneumatics
Lego minifigure
Lego tire

See also
 Legco